Wang Chunxin (Simplified Chinese:, born 25 November 1997) is a Chinese rower from Yingkou. He competed in the men's lightweight double sculls event at the 2016 Summer Olympics.

References

External links
 

1997 births
Living people
Chinese male rowers
Olympic rowers of China
Rowers at the 2016 Summer Olympics
Rowers from Liaoning
People from Yingkou